The Hudson Bay drainage basin is the drainage basin in northern North America where surface water empties into Hudson Bay and adjoining waters. The watershed's headwaters to the south-west are on the Continental Divide of the Americas, bounded at Triple Divide Peak to the south, and Snow Dome to the north.
The western and northern boundary of the watershed is the Arctic Divide, and the southern and eastern boundary is the Laurentian Divide.

Hudson Bay is often considered part of the Arctic Ocean. For example, the International Hydrographic Organization (in its current unapproved working edition only of Limits of Oceans and Seas) defines the Hudson Bay, with its outlet extending from 62.5 to 66.5 degrees north (just a few miles south of the Arctic Circle) as being part of the Arctic Ocean, specifically "Arctic Ocean Subdivision 9.11."  Other authorities include it with the Atlantic Ocean, in part because of its greater water budget connection. 

The Hudson Bay drainage basin coincides almost completely with the former territory Rupert's Land, claimed by the Hudson's Bay Company in the 17th century, and an ideal area for the early fur trade in northern and central North America.

See also
List of Hudson Bay rivers

References

 
Watersheds of Canada
Arctic Watershed of North America